Wang Meng (born April 10, 1985 in Qitaihe, Heilongjiang) is a Chinese short track speed skater. She is a four-time Olympic Champion and 2008 and 2009 Overall World Champion. She is the most decorated Chinese Winter Olympic athlete ever with four Olympic gold medals, a silver and a bronze. Wang won gold in the 500 m event, silver in the 1000 m and bronze in the 1500 m event at the 2006 Winter Olympics. She won 500 m and 1000 m gold medals at the 2010 Vancouver Olympics and added a third gold medal in the 3000 m relay with the China team. Wang has also won 18 gold medals at the World Championships. She is one of the most decorated short track speed skaters of all time.

Early life
Wang Meng started short track speed skating in 1994, when she was nine. In 1998 she entered Heilongjiang Provincial Sports School, which is affiliated of Harbin Institute of Physical Education. She graduated from Harbin Institute of Physical Education.

2010 Winter Olympics
Wang was considered a strong contender for all short track speed skating events at the 2010 Winter Olympics. She won the gold medal in the 500 m event in which she had previously been dominant and was considered to be the favorite to win. She set three Olympic records in the 500 m heats, while in the finals she led from start to finish accumulating a huge lead ahead of all other competitors. In the 1,500 m race, she failed to finish after having lost her footing and crashing into the barricades. However, she came back to win the 3,000 m relay with the Chinese team and the 1,000 m solo race. She ended up snatching three gold medals, which makes her the most successful Winter Olympian ever for China.

Conflict with the team manager
On 24 July 2011, Wang Meng had a physical conflict with the team manager Wang Chunlu at the hotel in the Qingdao training camp. In the scuffle her arm was injured and she had to be taken to a hospital. There was a lot of speculation in the media as to what had really happened, but both sides involved provided very different stories, which makes the truth unclear to this day.

Ten days after the incident, on 4 August 2011, Wang Meng was expelled from the national short track speed skating team and the same applied to her teammate Liu Xianwei, who actively supported Wang during those ten days. The team manager, Wang Chunlu, was moved to another position, and Liu Hao became the new team manager.

2014 Winter Olympics
On 16 January 2014, Wang collided with a teammate while training in Shanghai for the 2014 Winter Olympics. She broke her ankle, which required surgery and a recovery period of at least six months. She missed the Olympics as a result.

International Competition Podiums

References

External links

 
 
 
 

1985 births
Living people
Chinese female speed skaters
Chinese female short track speed skaters
Olympic short track speed skaters of China
Olympic medalists in short track speed skating
Olympic bronze medalists for China
Olympic silver medalists for China
Olympic gold medalists for China
Short track speed skaters at the 2006 Winter Olympics
Short track speed skaters at the 2010 Winter Olympics
Medalists at the 2010 Winter Olympics
Medalists at the 2006 Winter Olympics
Asian Games medalists in short track speed skating
Asian Games gold medalists for China
Asian Games silver medalists for China
Asian Games bronze medalists for China
Short track speed skaters at the 2003 Asian Winter Games
Short track speed skaters at the 2007 Asian Winter Games
Medalists at the 2003 Asian Winter Games
Medalists at the 2007 Asian Winter Games
People from Qitaihe
Sportspeople from Heilongjiang
Participants in Chinese reality television series